A queen dowager or dowager queen (compare: princess dowager or dowager princess) is a title or status generally held by the widow of a king. In the case of the widow of an emperor, the title of empress dowager is used. Its full meaning is clear from the two words from which it is composed: queen indicates someone who served as queen consort (i.e. wife of a king), while dowager indicates a woman continues to hold the title from her deceased husband (a queen who reigns in her own right is a queen regnant). A queen mother is a former queen consort, often a dowager queen, who is the mother of the reigning monarch.

Currently (2019) there are four queens dowager: Kesang Choden of Bhutan (who is the only living queen grandmother worldwide), Norodom Monineath of Cambodia (who is also queen mother), Lisa Najeeb Halaby (Noor Al'Hussein) of Jordan, and Sirikit Kitiyakara of Thailand (who is also queen mother). Queen Ratna of Nepal was queen dowager until the abolition of the Nepalese monarchy in 2008.

Status 
A queen dowager has an important royal position (whether or not she is the mother of the reigning sovereign) but does not normally have any rights to succeed a king as monarch on his death unless she happens to be next in line to the throne (one possibility would be if the king and queen were also cousins and childless, the king had no other siblings, and she in her other position as his cousin was also his heiress presumptive).

A queen dowager continues to enjoy the title, style, and precedence of a queen, but is no longer referred to as the queen. A new reigning king would have (at accession or eventually) a wife who would be the new queen consort and therefore the queen; and, of course, a queen regnant would also be called the queen. Many former queens consort do not formally use the word "dowager" as part of their titles. There may be more than one queen dowager at any given time. The Garter King of Arms's proclamation in the United Kingdom of the styles and titles of Queen Elizabeth The Queen Mother at her funeral on 9 April 2002 illustrates her dual status as a queen dowager and a queen mother:

Distinction from queen mother 
A queen mother is a former queen, often a queen dowager, who is the mother of the current monarch. Not every queen mother is a queen dowager, such as Queen Paola of Belgium, who became the queen mother of her son Philippe after her husband Albert II abdicated the throne but retained the title of king. Not all queens dowager are the queen mother; they may have a relation other than mother to the reigning monarch, such as aunt or grandmother. For example, Mary, Queen of Scots, was queen dowager of France after the death of her husband Francis II, to whom she bore no children. Similarly, Adelaide of Saxe-Meiningen was queen dowager after her husband William IV was succeeded by his niece Victoria.

Not every mother of a reigning monarch is the queen mother or a queen dowager. For example, the mother of Queen Victoria of United Kingdom, Victoria of Saxe-Coburg-Saalfeld, was not a queen dowager nor the queen mother because her husband, Edward Augustus, Duke of Kent, had never been king. Similarly, whilst being the mothers of monarchs, both Augusta of Saxe-Gotha and Srinagarindra of Thailand were not styled queen dowager because their respective husbands, Frederick, Prince of Wales and Mahidol Adulyadej, Prince of Songkla, were never kings. Instead, Augusta held the title of "Dowager Princess of Wales" (a precedent was Henry VII of England's mother, Lady Margaret Beaufort, titled "My Lady the King's Mother"); Srinagarindra meanwhile received the designation "Princess Mother".

As there is only one monarch, there can only be one queen mother. It is possible for there to be a queen mother and one or more queens dowager alive at any one time. This situation occurred in the Commonwealth realms in the period between the accession of Queen Elizabeth II on 6 February 1952 and the death of her paternal grandmother on 24 March 1953. For slightly over a year, there were three queens alive:

 Queen Elizabeth II, the reigning monarch (queen regnant).
 Queen Elizabeth The Queen Mother, the widow of the deceased King George VI and the mother of the reigning queen. Queen Elizabeth, the former queen consort, specifically adopted the appellation queen mother to distinguish herself from her daughter, Queen Elizabeth II. She reportedly loathed being referred to as a dowager queen, and felt there would be confusion if she were called simply by her name, as her two immediate predecessors, Queen Mary and Queen Alexandra, had been.
 Queen Mary, the widow of King George V, the mother of the former king Edward VIII (the then Duke of Windsor) and of the late King George VI. Queen Mary had been the queen mother from the death of her husband in 1936 until the accession of her granddaughter, Queen Elizabeth II, in 1952. She continued to be titled and styled Her Majesty Queen Mary.

British queens dowager 

There were several former queens consort of England, Scotland, and later the United Kingdom, who were never queen mothers.  The following queens were dowagers between the given dates, whether queen mothers or not:

Of England:
 Edith of Wessex 5 January 1066 – 18 December 1075, wife of Edward the Confessor; sister of Harold Godwinson.
 Adeliza of Louvain 1 December 1135 – 23 April 1151, wife of Henry I of England; remarried to William d'Aubigny, 1st Earl of Arundel in 1139.
 Eleanor of Aquitaine 6 July 1189 – 1 April 1204, wife of Henry II of England; queen mother to Richard I and John.
 Berengaria of Navarre 6 April 1199 – 23 December 1230, wife of Richard I of England.
 Isabella of Angoulême 18/19 October 1216 – 31 May 1246, wife of John of England and queen mother to Henry III of England. Remarried to Hugh X of Lusignan 1220.
 Eleanor of Provence 16 November 1272 – 24 June 1291, wife of Henry III of England and queen mother to Edward I of England.
 Marguerite of France 7 July 1307 – 14 February 1317, wife of Edward I of England and stepmother to Edward II of England.
 Isabella of France September 1327 – 22 August 1358, wife of Edward II of England and queen mother to Edward III of England, from her husband's deposition on 20 January 1327.
 Isabella of Valois 14 February 1399 – 13 September 1409, wife of Richard II of England; ceased to be queen consort with Richard's deposition on 30 September 1399. Remarried to Charles I de Valois, Duke of Orléans on 29 June 1406.
 Joanna of Navarre 20 March 1413—9 July 1437, wife of Henry IV of England and stepmother to Henry V of England.
 Catherine of Valois 31 August 1422 – 3 January 1437, wife of Henry V of England and queen mother to Henry VI of England. Remarried to Owen Tudor in 1428 or 1429.
 Margaret of Anjou 21 May 1471 – 25 August 1482, wife of Henry VI of England.
 Elizabeth Woodville 9 April 1483 – 8 June 1492, wife of Edward IV of England and queen mother to Edward V of England until the latter's deposition in 1483.

Of England and Ireland
 Anne of Cleves survived her marriage to Henry VIII until her death on 16 July 1557, but since her marriage had been annulled on 12 July 1540, she was not considered a queen dowager.
 Catherine Parr 28 January 1547 – 5 September 1548, sixth and last wife of Henry VIII of England and stepmother to his children King Edward VI, Lady Mary and Lady Elizabeth. Remarried to Thomas Seymour, 1st Baron Seymour of Sudeley most likely in mid-spring of 1547.

Of Scotland
 Margaret of Wessex 13 November 1093 – 6 November 1093, wife of Malcolm III of Scotland.
 Ermengarde de Beaumont 4 December 1214 – 12 February 1233/34, wife of William I of Scotland and queen mother to Alexander II of Scotland.
 Marie de Coucy 6 July 1249 – 1285, wife of Alexander II of Scotland and queen mother to Alexander III of Scotland. Remarried to Jean de Brienne in 1257.
 Yolande of Dreux 19 March 1286 – 2 August 1322, wife of Alexander III of Scotland. Remarried to Arthur II, Duke of Brittany in 1292.
 Joan Beaufort 21 February 1437 – 15 July 1445, wife of James I of Scotland and queen mother to James II of Scotland. Remarried to James Stewart in 1439.
 Mary of Guelders 3 August 1460 – 1 December 1463, wife of James II of Scotland and queen mother to James III of Scotland.
 Margaret Tudor 9 September 1513 – 8 October 1541, wife of James IV of Scotland and queen mother to James V of Scotland. Remarried to Archibald Douglas, 6th Earl of Angus in 1514 and Henry Stewart, 1st Lord Methven in 1528.
 Mary of Guise 14 December 1542 – 11 June 1560, wife of James V of Scotland  and queen mother to Mary, Queen of Scots.

Of England, Ireland and Scotland
 Henrietta Maria of France 30 January 1649 – 10 September 1669, wife of Charles I and queen mother to Charles II.
 Catherine of Braganza 6 February 1685 – 30 November 1705, wife of Charles II.
 Mary of Modena 16 September 1701 – 7 May 1718, wife of James II and VII; ceased to be queen consort with his deposition on 11 December 1688.

Of the United Kingdom: 
 Adelaide of Saxe-Meiningen 20 June 1837 – 2 December 1849, wife of William IV.
 Alexandra of Denmark 6 May 1910 – 20 November 1925, wife of Edward VII, queen mother to George V.
 Mary of Teck 20 January 1936 – 24 March 1953, wife of George V, queen mother to Edward VIII and George VI until the latter's death on 6 February 1952.
 Elizabeth Bowes-Lyon 6 February 1952 – 30 March 2002, wife of George VI and queen mother to Elizabeth II – styled as Queen Elizabeth The Queen Mother.

Other 
Note that in some of the countries mentioned below it is unusual to indicate a former queen-consort as a dowager.

East Asia

China 
 Queen Dowager Xuan, concubine of King Xiaowen and mother of King Zhaoxiang of Qin.
 Queen Dowager Zhao, wife of King Zhuangxiang of Qin and mother of Qin Shi Huang.
 Empress Lü, wife of Emperor Gaozu of Han.
 Wu Zetian, wife of Emperor Gaozong and mother of Emperors Zhongzong and Ruizong of Tang. Later became the only Empress regnant in the history of China.
 Empress Dowager Cixi, wife of Xianfeng Emperor and mother of Tongzhi Emperor of Qing.

Japan 
 Empress Dowager Eishō (11 January 1835 – 11 January 1897), wife and widow of Emperor Kōmei of Japan.
 Empress Shōken (9 May 1849 – 9 April 1914), wife and widow of Emperor Meiji of Japan.
 Empress Teimei (25 June 1884 – 17 May 1951), wife and widow of Emperor Taishō of Japan and mother of Emperor Shōwa.
 Empress Kōjun (6 March 1903 – 16 June 2000), wife and widow of Emperor Shōwa of Japan and mother of Emperor Akihito.

Korea 
 Queen Heonae (997–1009), wife and widow of Gyeongjong of Goryeo and sister of Seongjong of Goryeo, mother of Mokjong of Goryeo and daughter of Gwangjong of Goryeo
 Queen Jangryeol (1624–1688), wife and widow of Injo of Joseon step-mother of Hyojong of Joseon, step-grandmother of Hyeonjong of Joseon, step-great-grandmother of Sukjong of Joseon.
 Queen Jeongsun (1745–1805), second wife and widow of Yeongjo of Joseon and step-grandmother of Jeongjo of Joseon and step-great-grandmother of Sunjo of Joseon.

Europe

Croatia 
 Helen of Zadar (969 – 976), wife and widow of King Michael Krešimir II of Croatia.

Portugal 
 Beatrice of Castile (1242 – 27 October 1303), wife of King Afonso III of Portugal and mother of King Dinis I of Portugal
 Elizabeth of Aragon (1271 – 4 July 1336), wife of King Dinis I of Portugal and mother of King Afonso IV of Portugal
 Beatrice of Castile (8 March 1293 – 25 October 1359), wife of King Afonso IV of Portugal and mother of King Peter I of Portugal 
 Leonor Telles de Menezes (1350 – 27 April 1386), wife of King Fernando I of Portugal
 Eleanor of Aragon (1 February 1402 – 19 February 1445), wife of King Duarte I of Portugal and mother of King Afonso V of Portugal
 Eleanor of Viseu (2 May 1458 – 17 November 1525), wife of King João II of Portugal
 Eleanor of Austria (15 November 1498 – 25 February 1558), third wife of King Manuel I of Portugal
 Catherine of Austria (14 January 1507 – 12 February 1578), wife of King João III of Portugal and grandmother of King Sebastião I of Portugal
 Luisa of Guzman (13 October 1613 – 27 February 1666), wife of King João IV of Portugal and mother of Kings Afonso VI and Pedro II
 Maria Anna of Austria (7 September 1683 – 14 August 1754), wife of King João V of Portugal and mother of King José I of Portugal 
 Mariana Victoria of Spain (31 March 1718 – 15 January 1781), wife of King José I of Portugal and mother of Queen Maria I of Portugal
 Carlota Joaquina of Spain (25 April 1775 – 7 January 1830), wife of King João VI of Portugal and mother of King-Emperor Pedro IV of Portugal and King Miguel I of Portugal
 Maria Pia of Savoy (14 February 1847 – 5 July 1911), wife of King Luís I of Portugal and mother of King Carlos I of Portugal 
 Amélie of Orleans (28 September 1865 – 25 October 1951), wife of King Carlos I of Portugal and mother of King Manuel II of Portugal

Romania 
 Elisabeth of Wied (27 September 1914 – 2 March 1916), wife of King Carol I of Romania
 Marie of Edinburgh (20 July 1927 – 18 July 1938), wife of Ferdinand I of Romania

Saxony
 Maria Anna of Bavaria (27 January 1805 – 13 September 1877), second wife and widow of King Frederick Augustus II of Saxony.

Castile 
 Mafalda of Portugal (1197-1 May 1256), wife of King Henry I of Castile
 Constance of Portugal (3 January 1290 – 18 November 1313), wife of King Ferdinand IV of Castile, mother of King Alfonso XI of Castile
 Maria of Portugal (9 February 1313 – 18 January 1357), wife of King Alfonso XI of Castile, mother of King Peter I of Castile
 Isabella of Portugal (1428 – 15 August 1496), wife of King John II of Castile, mother of Isabella I of Castile
 Joan of Portugal (20 March 1439 – 12 December 1475), wife of King Henry IV of Castile

León 
 Urraca of Portugal (1151–1222), wife of King Ferdinand II of León, mother of King Alfonso IX of León 
 Teresa of Portugal (4 October 1178 – 8 June 1250), wife of King Alfonso IX of León
 Constance of Portugal (3 January 1290 – 18 November 1313), wife of King Fernando IV of León, mother of King Alfonso XI of León
 Maria of Portugal (9 February 1313 – 18 January 1357), wife of King Alfonso XI of León, mother of King Peter I of León 
 Isabella of Portugal (1428 – 15 August 1496), wife of King John II of León, mother of Isabella I of León
 Joan of Portugal (20 March 1439 – 12 December 1475), wife of King Henry IV of León

Sweden 
In Sweden, there has also been another title for a dowager queen, called Riksänkedrottning, which means Queen Dowager of the Realm.  This title was used in the 16th and 17th centuries.  The last time the title queen dowager was used was in 1913.

 Katarina Stenbock, (1537–1610), third wife and widow of King Gustav I of Sweden.
 Gunilla Bielke, (1568–1597), second wife and widow of King John III of Sweden.
 Christina of Holstein-Gottorp, (1573–1625), second wife and widow of King Charles IX of Sweden.
 Maria Eleonora of Brandenburg, (1599–1655), widow of King Gustaf II Adolf of Sweden.
 Hedvig Eleonora of Holstein-Gottorp, (1636–1715) widow of King Charles X Gustav of Sweden.
 Louisa Ulrika of Prussia, (1720–1781), widow of King Adolf Frederick of Sweden.
 Sophia Magdalena of Denmark, (1746–1815), widow of King Gustaf III of Sweden.
 Hedvig Elisabeth Charlotte of Holstein-Gottorp, (1759–1818) widow of King Charles XIII of Sweden.
 Désirée Clary, (1777–1860) widow of King Charles XIV John of Sweden.
 Josephine of Leuchtenberg, (1807–1876) widow of King Oscar I of Sweden.
 Sophia of Nassau, (1836–1913) widow of King Oscar II of Sweden.

Württemberg
 Charlotte, Princess Royal of Great Britain and Ireland (29 September 1765 – 5 October 1828), second wife and widow of King Frederick I of Württemberg and stepmother of King William I of Württemberg.
 Pauline Therese of Württemberg (25 June 1864 – 10 May 1873), second wife and widow of William I of Württemberg and mother of Charles I of Württemberg.
 Olga Nikolaevna of Russia (6 October 1891 – 30 October 1892), widow of Charles I of Württemberg.

Pacific

Hawaii
 Dowager Queen Ka'ahumanu, favoured wife of King Kamehameha I
 Queen Emma of Hawaii, queen consort of King Kamehameha IV

South America

Brazil 
 Amélie of Leuchtenberg (July 31, 1812 – January 26, 1873), wife and widow of Pedro I of Brazil.

Southeast Asia

Malaysia 
 Raja Perempuan Tengku Anis of Kelantan, widow of Sultan Ismail Petra
Tunku Puan Nora of Johor, widow of Sultan Ismail
 Raja Permaisuri Tuanku Bainun of Perak, widow of Sultan Azlan Shah
 Tunku Ampuan Najihah of Negeri Sembilan, widow of Tuanku Ja'afar
 Permaisuri Siti Aishah Abdul Rahman of Selangor, widow of Sultan Salahuddin
 Che Puan Besar Haminah of Kedah, widow of Sultan Abdul Halim
 Cik Puan Besar Kalsom of Pahang, widow of Sultan Haji Ahmad Shah

Myanmar
 Yun San, chief queen consort of King Alaungpaya and mother to three successive kings,Naungdawgyi, Hsinbyushin and Bodawpaya
 Shin Phyo Oo, chief queen consort of King Naungdawgyi, mother to Phaungka
 Me Myat Shwe, Princess of Taungoo, chief queen consort of King Tharawaddy, mother of King Pagan and Queen Consort Setkya Dewi
 Kyaut Maw Mibaya,Shin Min Yin, queen of the southern department of King Tharawaddy and mother of King Mindon
 Laungshe Mibaya, Nanzwe queen consort of King Mindon and mother of King Thibaw

Thailand 
 Amarindra, (7 September 1809 – 25 May 1826), wife and widow of King Rama I of Siam and mother of King Rama II of Siam.
 Sri Suriyendra, (21 July 1984 - 18 October 1836), wife and widow of King Rama II of Siam and mother of King Mongkut and King Pinklao.
 Saovabha Phongsri, (23 October 1910 – 20 October 1919), wife and widow of King Chulalongkorn of Siam and mother of King Vajiravudh and King Prajadhipok.
 Savang Vadhana, (23 October 1910 – 17 December 1955), wife and widow of King Chulalongkorn of Siam and grandmother of King Ananda Mahidol and King Bhumibol Adulyadej.
 Sukhumala Marasri, (23 October 1910 – 9 July 1927), wife and widow of King Chulalongkorn of Siam.
 Rambai Barni, (30 May 1941 – 22 May 1984), wife and widow of King Prajadhipok of Siam.
 Sirikit, (since 13 October 2016), wife and widow of King Bhumibol Adulyadej of Thailand and mother of King Vajiralongkorn.

West Asia

Jordan 
 Musbah bint Nasser (1884 – 15 March 1961), wife of Abdullah I of Jordan and mother of Talal of Jordan.
 Zein Al-Sharaf Talal (2 August 1916 – 26 April 1994), wife of Talal of Jordan and mother of Hussein of Jordan.
 Lisa Najeeb Halaby (Noor Al'Hussein) (b. 23 August 1951), the fourth wife and widow of King Hussein of Jordan and the stepmother of the current king, Abdullah II.

Fiction 
In the novel series The Princess Diaries, the character Princess Clarisse Marie Grimaldi Renaldo is the princess dowager of the principality of Genovia. In the films, where Genovia is portrayed as a kingdom, Clarisse is portrayed as a dowager queen.

In the fantasy novel series A Song of Ice and Fire, and later the HBO series Game of Thrones, the character Cersei Lannister became the queen mother to King Joffrey Baratheon after her husband Robert Baratheon was killed in a hunting accident, although she managed to strong-arm the position of regent as well, and was thus known as the "queen regent". In the episode "High Sparrow", the new queen consort, Margaery Tyrell, mocks Cersei's loss of power by asking her to clarify whether she should be addressed as queen mother or dowager queen.

In the 2015 Indian movie Baahubali-The Beginning and its sequel Baahubali-the Conclusion, actress Ramya Krishnan portrays the character "Rajamatha Shivagami Devi". In most Indian languages, the word 'rajamata' means 'Queen-Mother'.

In the video game Long Live the Queen, after the queen regnant of the kingdom of Nova is assassinated, her widower is referred to as the king-dowager.

Notes 

Royal titles
Widowhood